Mycology is the branch of biology concerned with the study of fungi, including their genetic and biochemical properties, their taxonomy and their use to humans, including as a source for tinder, traditional medicine, food, and entheogens, as well as their dangers, such as toxicity or infection.

A biologist specializing in mycology is called a mycologist.

Mycology branches into the field of phytopathology, the study of plant diseases, and the two disciplines remain closely related because the vast majority of plant pathogens are fungi.

Overview 
Although mycology was historically considered a branch of botany, the 1969 discovery of fungi's close evolutionary relationship to animals resulted in the study's reclassification as an independent field. Pioneer mycologists included Elias Magnus Fries, Christian Hendrik Persoon, Anton de Bary, Elizabeth Eaton Morse, and Lewis David von Schweinitz. Beatrix Potter, author of The Tale of Peter Rabbit, also made significant contributions to the field. 

Pier Andrea Saccardo developed a system for classifying the imperfect fungi by spore color and form, which became the primary system used before classification by DNA analysis. He is most famous for his Sylloge, which was a comprehensive list of all of the names that had been used for mushrooms. Sylloge is still the only work of this kind that was both comprehensive for the botanical kingdom Fungi and reasonably modern.

Many fungi produce toxins, antibiotics, and other secondary metabolites. For example, the cosmopolitan genus Fusarium and their toxins associated with fatal outbreaks of alimentary toxic aleukia in humans were extensively studied by Abraham Joffe.

Fungi are fundamental for life on earth in their roles as symbionts, e.g. in the form of mycorrhizae, insect symbionts, and lichens.  Many fungi are able to break down complex organic biomolecules such as lignin, the more durable component of wood, and pollutants such as xenobiotics, petroleum, and polycyclic aromatic hydrocarbons. By decomposing these molecules, fungi play a critical role in the global carbon cycle.

Fungi and other organisms traditionally recognized as fungi, such as oomycetes and myxomycetes (slime molds), often are economically and socially important, as some cause diseases of animals (including humans) and of plants.

Apart from pathogenic fungi, many fungal species are very important in controlling the plant diseases caused by different pathogens. For example, species of the filamentous fungal genus Trichoderma are considered one of the most important biological control agents as an alternative to chemical-based products for effective crop diseases management.

Field meetings to find interesting species of fungi are known as 'forays', after the first such meeting organized by the Woolhope Naturalists' Field Club in 1868 and entitled "A foray among the funguses".

Some fungi can cause disease in humans and other animals; the study of pathogenic fungi that infect animals is referred to as medical mycology.

History
It is believed that humans started collecting mushrooms as food in prehistoric times. Mushrooms were first written about in the works of Euripides (480-406 BC). The Greek philosopher Theophrastos of Eresos (371-288 BC) was perhaps the first to try to systematically classify plants; mushrooms were considered to be plants missing certain organs. It was later Pliny the Elder (23–79 AD), who wrote about truffles in his encyclopedia Naturalis historia. The word mycology comes from the Ancient Greek: μύκης (mukēs), meaning "fungus" and the suffix  (-logia), meaning "study".

The Middle Ages saw little advancement in the body of knowledge about fungi. However, the invention of the printing press allowed authors to dispel superstitions and misconceptions about the fungi that had been perpetuated by the classical authors.

The start of the modern age of mycology begins with Pier Antonio Micheli's 1737 publication of Nova plantarum genera. Published in Florence, this seminal work laid the foundations for the systematic classification of grasses, mosses and fungi.  He originated the still current genus names Polyporus and Tuber, both dated 1729 (though the descriptions were later amended as invalid by modern rules).

The founding nomenclaturist Carl Linnaeus included fungi in his binomial naming system in 1753, where each type of organism has a two-word name consisting of a genus and species (whereas up to then organisms were often designated with Latin phrases containing many words). He originated the scientific names of numerous well-known mushroom taxa, such as Boletus and Agaricus, which are still in use today. During this period, fungi were still considered to belong to the plant kingdom, so they were categorized in his Species Plantarum. Linnaeus' fungal taxa were not nearly as comprehensive as his plant taxa, however, grouping together all gilled mushrooms with a stem in genus Agaricus. Thousands of gilled species exist, which were later divided into dozens of diverse genera; in its modern usage, Agaricus only refers to mushrooms closely related to the common shop mushroom, Agaricus bisporus. For example, Linnaeus gave the name Agaricus deliciosus to the saffron milk-cap, but its current name is Lactarius deliciosus. On the other hand, the field mushroom Agaricus campestris has kept the same name ever since Linnaeus's publication. The English word "agaric" is still used for any gilled mushroom, which corresponds to Linnaeus's use of the word.

The term mycology and the complementary term mycologist are traditionally attributed to M.J. Berkeley in 1836. However, mycologist appeared in writings by English botanist Robert Kaye Greville as early as 1823 in reference to Schweinitz.

Mycology and drug discovery

For centuries, certain mushrooms have been documented as a folk medicine in China, Japan, and Russia. Although the use of mushrooms in folk medicine is centered largely on the Asian continent, people in other parts of the world like the Middle East, Poland, and Belarus have been documented using mushrooms for medicinal purposes.

Mushrooms produce large amounts of vitamin D when exposed to ultraviolet (UV) light. Penicillin, ciclosporin, griseofulvin, cephalosporin and psilocybin are examples of drugs that have been isolated from molds or other fungi.

See also 

 Ethnomycology
 Glossary of mycology
 Fungal biochemical test
 List of mycologists
 List of mycology journals
 Marine fungi
 Mushroom hunting
 Mycotoxicology
 Pathogenic fungi
 Protistology

References

Cited literature

External links

Professional organizations
BMS: British Mycological Society (United Kingdom)
MSA: Mycological Society of America (North America)
Amateur organizations
MSSF: Mycological Society of San Francisco
North American Mycological Association (list of amateur organizations in North America)
Puget Sound Mycological Society
Oregon Mycological Society
IMA Illinois Mycological Association
Miscellaneous links
Online lectures in mycology University of South Carolina
The WWW Virtual Library: Mycology
MykoWeb links page
Mycological Glossary at the Illinois Mycological Association
FUNGI Magazine for professionals and amateurs – largest circulating U.S. publication concerning all things mycological
Fungal Cell Biology Group at University of Edinburgh, UK.
Mycological Marvels Cornell University, Mann Library

 
Branches of biology